Sam Mollison is an electronic music producer and vocalist.  He has collaborated with Sasha for his release of "Magic" and The Qat Collection.  He has also had his own work released on FFRR and INCredible.

Mollison's 1992 release "Will You Love Me in the Morning" was a popular choice in Northern English dance music venues.

External links

English record producers
English male singers
Living people
FFRR Records artists
INCredible artists
Place of birth missing (living people)
Year of birth missing (living people)